Heart to Heart is an album of jazz standards by drummer Elvin Jones recorded in 1980 and released on the Japanese Denon label.

Track listing
 "Yesterdays" (Otto Harbach, Jerome Kern) - 5:45 
 "If I Were a Bell" (Frank Loesser) - 6:32 
 "Moon River" (Henry Mancini, Johnny Mercer) - 7:57 
 "Warm Valley" (Duke Ellington) - 12:06 
 "Joash" (Richard Davis) - 7:30

Personnel
Elvin Jones  - drums
Tommy Flanagan - piano 
Richard Davis - bass

References

Elvin Jones albums
1980 albums
Denon Records albums